Evert Gerrit Kroon (9 September 1946 – 2 April 2018) was a water polo goalkeeper from The Netherlands, who participated in three consecutive Summer Olympics, starting in 1968. After two seventh-place finishes Kroon won the bronze medal with the Dutch Men's Water Polo Team at the 1976 Summer Olympics in Montreal, Quebec, Canada. He was given the honour to carry the national flag of the Netherlands at the closing ceremony of the 1976 Summer Olympics in Montreal, becoming the thirteenth water polo player to be a flag bearer at the opening and closing ceremonies of the Olympics.

He was born in Hilversum, North Holland and died in Hollandsche Rading.

See also
 Netherlands men's Olympic water polo team records and statistics
 List of Olympic medalists in water polo (men)
 List of men's Olympic water polo tournament goalkeepers

References

External links
 

1946 births
2018 deaths
Sportspeople from Hilversum
Dutch male water polo players
Water polo goalkeepers
Olympic bronze medalists for the Netherlands in water polo
Water polo players at the 1968 Summer Olympics
Water polo players at the 1972 Summer Olympics
Water polo players at the 1976 Summer Olympics
Medalists at the 1976 Summer Olympics
20th-century Dutch people